Saint-Pons-de-Thomières (Languedocien: Sant Ponç de Tomièiras) is a commune in the Hérault department in the Occitanie region in southern France.

History
It is named after its patron saint, Saint Pontius of Cimiez (Pons de Cimiez in French), martyr under Emperor Valerian, who is venerated throughout the diocese of Montpellier.

The Abbey of St-Pons was founded in 936 by Raymond, Count of Toulouse, who brought to it the monks of Saint Gerald of Aurillac.

By a papal bull of 18 February 1318, Pope John XXII raised the abbey to an episcopal see.

A Brief of 16 June 1877 authorized the bishops of Montpellier to call themselves bishops of Montpellier, Béziers, Agde, Lodève, and Saint-Pons, in memory of the different dioceses united in the present Diocese of Montpellier.

Population

See also
Communes of the Hérault department

References

Communes of Hérault